Đào Duy Anh (1904–1988) was a historian, geographer, lexicographer, linguist, cultural researcher and folklorist in Vietnam.

Đào Duy Anh may also refer to:
 David Dao (born 1948), Vietnamese-American doctor, musician